The definitive leaf-eared mouse (Phyllotis definitus) is a species of rodent in the family Cricetidae. It is found only in west central Peru, in rocky and shrub-covered areas at elevations between 2600 and 3000 m.

References

Musser, G. G. and M. D. Carleton. 2005. Superfamily Muroidea. pp. 894–1531 in Mammal Species of the World a Taxonomic and Geographic Reference. D. E. Wilson and D. M. Reeder eds. Johns Hopkins University Press, Baltimore.

Phyllotis
Mammals of Peru
Mammals described in 1915
Taxonomy articles created by Polbot